Mark Owen Woyongo (born 9 June 1946) is a Ghanaian politician and the Ghanaian Minister for the Interior for the Ghanaian Ministry of the Interior. He was also the Member of Parliament for the Navrongo Central constituency in Ghana.

Woyongo first stood for election on the ticket of the National Democratic Congress in the 2008 Ghanaian parliamentary election, winning 41.7% of the votes and losing to Joseph Kofi Adda of the New Patriotic Party by 1,130 votes (3.5%). He was however appointed the Upper East Regional Minister by President Mills in his government in 2009. He was retained in this position by President Mahama following the death of Mills. In 2013, he was nominated by President Mahama for the position of Minister for Defence.

Early life and education 
Mark Owen Woyongo was born on 9 June 1946 in Bolgatanga in the Upper East Region of Ghana. He attended Notre Dame Secondary School in Navrongo in 1966. He completed a Diploma in Journalism from Ghana Institute of Journalism in 1971. He has undertaken many professional courses in Ghana and abroad.

Political career 
Mark Owen Woyongo was the Public Relations Officer for the Upper East Regional Administration from 1978 and 1985. He was appointed the Regional Information Officer, Upper East Region in 1985. In 1994, he was appointed the Minister Counselor for Information at the Ghana High Commission in London, United Kingdom. Mark Woyongo was the Minister for the Upper East Region from 2009 – 2012. He survived a fatal accident when returning from the NDC congress held in the Upper East region.

He won the 2012 parliamentary elections on the ticket of the National Democratic Congress (NDC). In 2013, he was appointed Defence Minister and subsequently to the Ministry of the Interior during his tenure as Upper East Regional Minister.

Personal life 
Mark Woyongo is married and has two children.

See also 
List of Mills government ministers
List of Mahama government ministers

References

External links

Living people
Ghanaian Roman Catholics
Ghanaian MPs 2013–2017
Defence ministers of Ghana
Interior ministers of Ghana
National Democratic Congress (Ghana) politicians
Ghanaian civil servants
Cabinet Ministers of Ghana
1946 births